Yes lead singer Jon Anderson has performed solo shows since 1979 and solo tours since 1980.

The 1970s

1979

The 1980s

1980: Song of Seven Tour
Typical setlist:
 "Olias of Sunhillow" excerpt (1976)
 "For You for Me" (1980)
 "Yes Medley Part 1" (including Intro, To Be Over (1974), Instrumental#1, The Prophet (1970), Long Distance Runaround (1971), Instrumental#2, Wonderous Stories (1977))
 Rejoice (1978) 
 "Yes Medley Part 2" (including I've Seen All Good People (1971), The Revealing Science Of God (1973), I've Seen All Good People (1971) reprise, The Remembering (1973), Nous Sommes Du Soleil (1973)) 
 "Some Are Born" (1980)
 "Don't Forget (Nostalgia)" (1980)
 "Petrushka" (1911) (Igor Stravinsky)
 "Short Stories Medley" [a. "Far Away in Baagad" / b. "Bird Song" / c. "One More Time"] (1980) ("I Hear You Now" was played along with "One More Time" in Munich, West Germany)
 "Hear It" (1980)
 "Take Your Time" (1980)
 "Song of Seven" (1980)
 "Heart of the Matter" (1980) or "Tour Song"
 "Roundabout" (1971)

The New Life Band: 
Ronnie Leahy - Keyboards
Chris Rainbow - Keyboards/percussion
Barry de Souza - Drums
John Giblin - Bass
Joe Partridge - Guitars
Morris Pert - Drums/percussion
Les Davidson - Guitars
Dick Morrissey - Sax/Flute

1982: Animation Tour
Typical setlist:

 "Ocean Song" (1976) (Olias of Sunhillow opening; audio tape played through the PA system) 
 "Sleight of Hand" (played at least one time on 30 July 1982 in Philadelphia) (Dave Sancious instrumental) 
 "State of Independence" (1981)
 "Song of Seven" (1980) (Intro only) → 
 "The Friends of Mr Cairo" (1981)
 "Instrumental#1" 
 "Yes medley #1" (including Close to the Edge (1972), Heart of the Sunrise (1971), Wonderous Stories (1977), And You and I (1972), Long Distance Runaround (1971), Close to the Edge (1972) reprise) 
 "Band introduction" 
 "A Play and Display of the Heart" (1976) (Dave Sancious instrumental) 
 "Animation" (1982) 
 "Surrender" (1982) 
 "All in a Matter of Time" (1982)
 "Dave Sancious keyboards solo" → 
 "Soon" (1974)  
 "Yes medley #2" (including Perpetual Change (1971), I've Seen All Good People (1971), Yours Is No Disgrace (1971), Starship Trooper (1971), Awaken (1977)) 
 "Instrumental#2" (Bass & drum solos → Animation jam) 
 "Roundabout" (1971) 
 "Olympia" (1982)

1986: One-off California show

The 1990s

1992–1999

The 2000s

2000–2004: Brazil, North America & South America tours & shows

2005–2006: Tour of the Universe

2006: Anderson / Wakeman tour

2007–2009: North America & Europe tours & shows

2009: Have Guitar Will Travel tour

2009: North America tours

The 2010s

2010–2013

2014

"Acoustic Evening 2014" Tour typical setlist (except for the Clearwater show opening for Alan Parsons Project, the "Progressive Nation At Sea 2014" Cruise show and the Anderson Ponty Band's debut show on 20 September 2014 at the Wheeler Opera House in Aspen, Colorado, United States):
 "Open" excerpt ("Sun Is Calling") (2011) →
 "Yours Is No Disgrace" (1971) 
 "Sweet Dreams" (1970) 
 "America" (1968) (Paul Simon) 
 "Time and a Word" (1970) (quoting She Loves You (1963) (Lennon/McCartney)) 
 "One Love" (1977) (Bob Marley / Curtis Mayfield) 
 "Under Heaven's Door" (2010) (also known as "Never") 
 "To the Runner" (1976) (Olias of Sunhillow excerpt) (presumably dropped from the set after the 26 February 2014 show in Dallas, TX) 
 "Flight Of The Moorglade" (1976) (Olias of Sunhillow excerpt) (presumably added to the set starting from the 14 March 2014 show in Aspen, Co) 
 "I'll Find My Way Home" (1981) 
 "Open" excerpt ("Please To Remember") (2011) →
 "Starship Trooper" (1971) 
 "Long Distance Runaround" (1971) 
 "Give Love Each Day" (2001) 
 "Owner of a Lonely Heart" (1983) 
 "Solo / Yes Piano Medley" (including "Set Sail" (2006), "Close To The Edge" (1972), "Heart Of The Sunrise" (1971), "Marry Me Again", "The Revealing Science of God (Dance of the Dawn)" (excerpt) (1973)) 
 "You Got The Light" (not yet published) 
 "And You And I" (1972) 
 "The Ancient (Giants Under the Sun)" ("Leaves Of Green" excerpt) (1973)
 "Ritual (Nous sommes du soleil)" (excerpt) (1973) (presumably added to the set starting from the 14 March 2014 show in Aspen, Co)  
 "Tony and Me" (not yet published) 
 "A Day In The Life" (1967) (Lennon / McCartney) (presumably added to the set starting from the 14 March 2014 show in Aspen, Co; sometimes played between "Give Love Each Day" and "Owner Of A Lonely Heart" as on 13 April 2014 in Ridgefield, CT)
 "Turn of the Century" (1977) (presumably added to the set starting from the 14 March 2014 show in Aspen, Co)
 "I've Seen All Good People" (1971) (quoting Give Peace A Chance (1969) (John Lennon)) 
 "Roundabout" (1971) 
 "Open" excerpt ("Sun Is Calling" reprise) (2011) →
 "State Of Independence" (1980) 
 "Wonderous Stories" (1977) 
 "Soon" ("The Gates of Delirium" closing section) (1974)

Clearwater 2014 show setlist (opening for Alan Parsons Project):
 "State of Independence" (1981) 
 "Open" (2011) → 
 "Starship Trooper" (1971) 
 "Long Distance Runaround" (1971) 
 "Earth and Peace" 
 "Owner Of A Lonely Heart" (1983)
 "And You And I" (1972) 
 "Change We Must" (1991/1994)
 "I've Seen All Good People" (1971) (quoting Give Peace A Chance (1969) (John Lennon)) 
 "Roundabout" (1971)

"Progressive Nation At Sea 2014" Cruise show setlist:

Backed by Transatlantic, Jon performed only a (50-minute) 4-track show : 
 "The Revealing Science of God" (1973) 
 "Long Distance Runaround" (1971) 
 "And You And I" (1972) 
 "Starship Trooper" (1971)

"Anderson Ponty Band's (20 September 2014) debut show" setlist:

Part 1:
 "Intro" →
 "One In The Rhythm of Hope" (2015) 
 "A for Aria" (2015) 
 "Yours Is No Disgrace" (1971/not yet published) 
 "Listening With Me" (2015) 
 "Time and A Word" (1970/2015) 
 "Jig" (not yet published) 
 "Infinite Mirage" (2015) 
 "Soul Eternal" (2015) 
 "I See You Messenger" (2015) 
 "Owner of a Lonely Heart" (1983/2015) 
Part 2:
 "New Country" (1976/not yet published) 
 "Wonderous Stories" (1977/2015) 
 "Long Distance Runaround" (1971/not yet published) 
 "Renaissance of the Sun" (1976/2015) 
 "Enigmatic Ocean Parts 1 & 2" (incl. drums solo) (1977/not yet published) 
 "New New World" (2015) 
 "And You and I" (1972/2015) 
 "Starship Trooper" (1971/not yet published) 
 "Bass solo" (not yet published) →
 "Roundabout" (1971/2015)

2015: As Jon Anderson (unique show)

2015: As APB (Better Late Than Never Tour)
In support of the Anderson Ponty Band's debut album, Better Late Than Never (released on 25 September 2015), a 17-date North America Fall 2015 tour named the "Better Late Than Never" tour was scheduled, starting on 23 October 2015 in Stroudsburg, Pennsylvania and ending on 21 November 2015 in Scottsdale, Arizona. The APB's 2015 touring lineup was Jon Anderson, Jean-Luc Ponty, Rayford Griffin, Wally Minko, Keith Jones and Jamie Glaser.

The Anderson Ponty Band (APB) rehearsed for two weeks at the Sherman Theater in Stroudsburg, PA in anticipation of the 27 October 2015 show in Glenside, PA (the originally planned start of the tour). Then the Sherman Theater asked the band to play a show in Stroudsburg before the true beginning of the tour. Thus, the 23 October 2015 show was announced only just one week earlier.

Anderson Ponty Band's North America Fall 2015 "Better Late Than Never" Tour typical setlist:

Set #1: 
Intro (2015; track #1 from the Better Late Than Never album) →
"One In the Rhythm of Hope" (2015) 
"A For Aria" (2015) 
"Owner Of A Lonely Heart" (1983/2015) 
"Listening With Me" (2015) 
"Time And A Word" (1970/2015) (sometimes incl. "One Love" snippet (1977)) 
"Infinite Mirage" (2015) 
"Soul Eternal" (2015) 
"Jig" (not yet published) or "Enigmatic Oceans" (incl. Drum Solo) (1977/not yet published) 
"I See You Messenger" (2015) 
"New New World" (2011/2015)

Set #2: 
Intro (sometimes incl. "Close To The Edge" snippet (1972)) →
"New Country" (1976/not yet published) 
"Under Heaven's Door" (2010) (also known as "Never" or "Never Ever") 
"Wonderous Stories" (1977/2015) 
"Long Distance Runaround" (1971/not yet published) 
"Renaissance of the Sun" (1976/2015) 
"State of Independence" (1981/not yet published) 
"Enigmatic Oceans" (incl. Drum Solo) (1977/not yet published) or "Jig" (not yet published) 
"And You And I" (1972/2015) 
(Keith Jones) Bass Solo (not yet published) →
"Roundabout" (1971/2015) 
Encore:
"Re-Remembering Molecules" (2015) (sometimes incl. "Yours Is No Disgrace" snippet (1971)) (not played at all the late shows of the tour)
"Soon" (1974/not yet published) (not played at all the late shows of the tour)

2016: As APB (Better Late Than Never Tour)
From 25 February to 11 March 2016, the Anderson Ponty Band revealed, via their official Facebook page, the 18 dates of their Spring 2016 North-American Tour due to kick off on 28 April 2016 in Tucson, Arizona and to end with two shows in Canada on 26 May 2016 in Montreal, Québec and on 27 May 2016 in Québec City, Québec.

It was announced that the APB's 2016 touring lineup would remain Jon Anderson, Jean-Luc Ponty, Rayford Griffin, Wally Minko, Keith Jones and Jamie Glaser.

Anderson Ponty Band's North America Spring 2016 "Better Late Than Never" Tour typical setlist:

Set #1: 
Intro (2015; track #1 from the Better Late Than Never album) →
"One In the Rhythm of Hope" (2015) 
"A For Aria" (2015) 
"Owner Of A Lonely Heart" (1983/2015) 
"Listening With Me" (2015) 
"Time And A Word" (1970/2015) (sometimes incl. "One Love" snippet (1977)) 
"Infinite Mirage" (2015) 
"Soul Eternal" (2015) 
"Jig" (not yet published) (or "Enigmatic Oceans" (incl. Drum Solo) (1977/not yet published) only on 28 April 2016)
"New New World" (2011/2015)

Set #2: 
Intro: The Revealing Science of God (Jon's spoken lyrics) (1973)) →
"New Country" (1976/not yet published) 
"Under Heaven's Door" (2010) (also known as "Never" or "Never Ever") 
"Wonderous Stories" (1977/2015) 
"Long Distance Runaround" (1971/not yet published) 
"Renaissance of the Sun" (1976/2015) 
"State of Independence" (1981/not yet published) 
"Enigmatic Oceans" (incl. Drum Solo) (1977/not yet published) (or "Jig" (not yet published) only on 28 April 2016) 
"And You And I" (1972/2015) 
(Keith Jones) Bass Solo (not yet published) →
"Roundabout" (1971/2015) 
Encore:
Close to the Edge (Jon's spoken lyrics) (1972)) → 
"Re-Remembering Molecules" (2015) (sometimes incl. "Yours Is No Disgrace" snippet (1971))
"Soon" (1974/not yet published)

Compared with the North America Fall 2015 "Better Late Than Never" Tour typical setlist, the main differences here are the song "I See You Messenger" dropped from the setlist and two Jon's spoken lyrics intros added to the setlist, one before the 2nd set and the other before the encore.

2019: 1000 Hands Tour

Setlist from the Orlando (Disney Epcot) warmup show on March 12, 2019:

Set #1: 
 "Owner of A Lonely Heart" (1983) 
 "America" (1972/1975) 
 "Yours Is No Disgrace" (1971) 
 "Makes Me Happy" (2019) (1000 Hands: Chapter One excerpt)
 "Roundabout" (1971)

Set #2: 
 "Owner of A Lonely Heart" (1983) 
 "I’ve Seen All Good People" (1971) 
 "Starship Trooper / Solid Space" (1971) / (1976) (Olias of Sunhillow excerpt) 
 "Ramalama" (2019) (1000 Hands: Chapter One excerpt)
 "Roundabout" (1971)

Set #3: 
 "Owner of A Lonely Heart" (1983) 
 "Makes Me Happy" (2019) (1000 Hands: Chapter One excerpt)
 "WDMCF" ("Where Does Music Come From") (2019) (1000 Hands: Chapter One excerpt)
 "Yours Is No Disgrace" (1971) 
 "Roundabout" (1971)

Typical setlist (starting from the Lynn show on March 29, 2019):

Set #1: 
 "Ocean Song" (1976) (Olias of Sunhillow excerpt) 
 "Owner of a Lonely Heart" (1983) 
 "Yours is No Disgrace" (1971) 
 "Ramalama" (2019) (1000 Hands: Chapter One excerpt) 
 "State of Independence " (1981) 
 "Makes Me Happy" (2019) (1000 Hands: Chapter One excerpt)
 "I've Seen All Good People" (1971) 
 "WDMCF" ("Where Does Music Come From") (2019) (1000 Hands: Chapter One excerpt)

Set #2: 
 "Flight of the Moorglade" (1976) (Olias of Sunhillow excerpt) 
 "Sweet Dreams" (1970) 
 "To the Runner" (1976) (Olias of Sunhillow excerpt) 
 "First Born Leaders" (2019) (1000 Hands: Chapter One excerpt)
 "America" (1972/1975) 
 "Come Up (1000 Hands)" (2019) (1000 Hands: Chapter One excerpt)
 "Starship Trooper / Solid Space" ((1971) / (1976) (Olias of Sunhillow excerpt)

Encore:
 "Roundabout" (1971)

The 2020s

2021: US tour with the Paul Green Rock Academy 
On 30 June 2021, Anderson announced a Summer 2021 11-city tour of US theaters with the Paul Green Rock Academy due to kick off 30 July in Patchogue, New York, and to wrap up 28 August in Woonsocket, Rhode Island. According to a press release, the show should feature «a set of Yes classics, deep cuts, mashups, and solo works, all with lush arrangements featuring choral singing, horns, and all the other benefits of having a backing band of 25 young musicians.»

2022: US tour with the Paul Green Rock Academy 
On 10 February 2022, Anderson announced a Spring 2022 5-city tour of US theaters with the Paul Green Rock Academy due to kick off April 6, 2022 in Atlanta, GA, and to wrap up April 16, 2022 in Sarasota, FL.

Notes

References

External links
Jon Anderson Online Past & present versions
Jean-Luc Ponty Official website / Dates de concert 

Lists of concert tours